Standard Building may refer to:

Standard Building (Cleveland, Ohio)
Standard Building (Columbus, Ohio)